Joab Hamilton Banton (August 27, 1869 in Huntsville, Walker County, Texas – July 20, 1949) was New York County District Attorney from 1922 to 1929.

Early life and education
He was the son of Joab H. Banton, a judge in Waco, Texas, and Imogene (Hamilton) Banton. He graduated A.B. from Kentucky University in 1890, and was admitted to the bar in Texas in 1891. On June 17, 1896, he married Maud Harris in Belton, Texas. Afterwards he removed to New York City and continued there the practice of law.

Career
In January 1918, he was appointed by D.A. Edward Swann an Assistant D.A. and remained in office until August 1919 when he resigned to resume his private practice as a partner in Banton, Ferguson & Moore. In July 1920, he defended D.A. Swann in a one-million-dollar suit brought by Gaston Means. Banton was appointed by Swann Chief Assistant D.A. in January 1921, and during most of the year acted as District Attorney while Swann remained out-of-state. In November 1921, Banton was elected on the Tammany Hall ticket New York County District Attorney, defeating the "Coalition" candidate John Kirkland Clark. On taking office in January 1922, Banton appointed Ferdinand Pecora as his Chief Assistant D.A.

As D.A., Banton indicted more than 100 bucket shops during the Roaring 20's. In 1924, he got a conviction of William H. Anderson of the New York Anti-Saloon League on fraud charges.

In 1925, he was re-elected with a large plurality over Ex-Governor Charles S. Whitman who had been New York County D.A. from 1910 to 1914. Banton was instrumental in establishing peace between the On Leong Chinese Merchants Association and the Hip Sing Association in the Tong War for control of Chinatown.

His office investigated the murder of Arnold Rothstein and prosecuted George "Hump" McManus, who was acquitted.

See also
Edward M. Fuller & Company

Sources
BANTON RESIGNS POST in NYT on August 28, 1919
SWANN ANSWERS MEANS in NYT on July 3, 1920
CLARK, IN OPEN TILT, BOMBARDS BANTON in NYT on October 31, 1921
BANTON ASKS DEITY TO GUIDE HIS TERM in NYT on January 2, 1922

References

1869 births
1949 deaths
People from Huntsville, Texas
Transylvania University alumni
New York County District Attorneys
New York (state) Democrats